Nimiq-5 is a Canadian communications satellite, operated by Telesat Canada as part of its Nimiq fleet of satellites. It is positioned in geostationary orbit at a longitude of 72.7° West of the Greenwich Meridian. As of July 2015, EchoStar Corporation leases the satellite's entire capacity to provide high-definition television direct-to-home broadcasting for Dish Network Corporation. When accessed using a multi-satellite receiver such as the VIP722k and a multi-satellite dish/LNB combo, such as the Dish-300, Dish-500, or Dish-Turbo 1000.4, the satellite is (incorrectly) referred to by the on-screen diagnostics as Echostar 72 W.

Spacecraft 
Nimiq-5 was built by Space Systems/Loral, and is based on the LS-1300 satellite bus. The contract to build it was announced on 4 January 2007. It carries 32 Ku-band transponders frequency designation system.

Launch 
Nimiq-5 was launched by International Launch Services (ILS), using a Proton-M launch vehicle with a Briz-M upper stage, under a contract signed in April 2007. The launch was conducted from Site 200/39 at the Baikonur Cosmodrome in Kazakhstan, at 19:19:19 UTC on 17 September 2009. The Briz-M separated from the Proton-M nine minutes and forty one seconds into the flight and subsequently made five burns before releasing Nimiq-5 into a geosynchronous transfer orbit nine hours and fifteen minutes after liftoff.

See also 

 2009 in spaceflight

References 

Spacecraft launched in 2009
Satellites using the SSL 1300 bus